Liothorax is a genus of beetles belonging to the subfamily Aphodiinae.

The species of this genus are found in Europe, Asia, North America, and Central America.

Species
These 10 species belong to the genus Liothorax. Several of these species have been transferred from the genus Aphodius.
 Liothorax alternatus (Horn, 1870)
 Liothorax consociatus (Horn, 1887)
 Liothorax innexus (Say, 1835)
 Liothorax isikdagensis (Balthasar, 1952)
 Liothorax kraatzi (Harold, 1868)
 Liothorax levatus (Schmidt, 1907)
 Liothorax niger (Illiger, 1798)
 Liothorax plagiatus (Linnaeus, 1767)
 Liothorax rusakovi (Gusakov, 2004)
 Liothorax subaeneus (LeConte, 1857)

References

Scarabaeidae
Scarabaeidae genera
Taxa named by Victor Motschulsky